Roberto Rivas González (17 July 1941 – 8 February 1972) was a football player from El Salvador who played as a defender.

Club career
Nicknamed La Burra (The Donkey), Rivas was a one-club man and has only played for Alianza during the 1960s and won two league titles in 1965 and 1966 when he played alongside fellow club legends like José Quintanilla, Mario Monge and Francisco Zamora.

International career
Rivas has represented his country in 10 FIFA World Cup qualification matches and played at the 1968 Olympic Games and at the 1970 FIFA World Cup in Mexico.

Death
Rivas died in a suicide in 1972. By June 2010, Rivas was one of six 1968 Olympic footballers of El Salvador who had already died. Alianza retired the number 2 shirt in honour of Rivas.

References

External links
 En la decada de los 70's El Alianza tubo 4 futbolistas grandes 2 defenzas un medio campista y un delantero pero desafortunadamente Fallecieron uno se mato el solo otro fue acribillado el otro accidente de transito y el otro Ahogado 

1941 births
1972 deaths
Association football defenders
Salvadoran footballers
El Salvador international footballers
Olympic footballers of El Salvador
Footballers at the 1968 Summer Olympics
1970 FIFA World Cup players
Alianza F.C. footballers
1972 suicides
Suicides in El Salvador